The men's triple jump at the 2012 IPC Athletics European Championships was held at Stadskanaal Stadium from 24–29 July.

Medalists
Results given by IPC Athletics.

Results

F11

F12

F46

See also
List of IPC world records in athletics

References

Triple jump